Eoophyla grandifuscalis is a moth in the family Crambidae. It was described by David John Lawrence Agassiz in 2012. It is found in Cameroon and Nigeria.

The wingspan is 15–25 mm. The forewings are dark fuscous with a pale antemedian fascia, which is yellowish in the dorsal half of the wing. The hindwings are white, irrorated (sprinkled) with fuscous.

Etymology
The species name refers to the large size and predominant colouration of the forewings.

References

Eoophyla
Moths described in 2012